The Syria women's national under-20 football team, colloquially known as Qasioun Eagles represents Syria in international women's youth football. The team is controlled by the Syrian Football Association (SFA), the governing body for football in Syria. The team also serves as the women's national under-19 and women's national under-18 teams of Syria. 

While the team has never participated in either the FIFA U-20 Women's World Cup or the AFC U-20 Women's Asian Cup, they have participated on WAFF U-18 Girls Championship, and were runners-up in 2022.

Competitive record

FIFA U-20 Women's World Cup

AFC U-20 Women's Asian Cup

WAFF U-18 Girls Championship

Recent results and matches
 Legend

2022

Coaching staff

Current coaching staff

Players

Current squad
The following players were called up for the 2022 WAFF U-18 Girls Championship.

Recent call-ups
The following footballers were part of a national selection in the past 12 months, but are not part of the current squad.

Player records

Top scorers

. Highlighted names denote a player still playing or available for selection.

Honours

Regional
 WAFF U-18 Girls Championship
  3rd place: 2022

See also
Syria women's national football team
Syria national under-20 football team
Football in Syria

References

under-20
Arabic women's national under-20 association football teams
Youth football in Syria
Asian women's national under-20 association football teams